The 2007–08 ACB season was the 25th season of the Asociación de Clubs de Baloncesto.  The 612-game regular season (34 games for each of the 18 teams) began on Saturday, October 6, 2007, and ended on Friday, May 9, 2008. The ACB playoffs started on Thursday, May 15, 2008 and ran until Tuesday, June 3, 2008.

TAU Cerámica won the Final series by 3-0 against AXA FC Barcelona and obtained their second ACB championship.

Some changes were introduced in this ACB season:
 First place in the Regular Season granted direct access to the following Euroleague season
 Playoffs' Quarterfinal and Semifinal series were 3-match rounds instead of 5-match rounds

Team standings 

|}

Summary 

 Will participate in the Euroleague 2008-09:
TAU Vitoria, Unicaja Málaga, Real Madrid, F.C. Barcelona and DKV Joventut Badalona.
 Will participate in the ULEB Cup 2008-09:
Pamesa Valencia, Iurbentia Bilbao Basket, Akasvayu Girona and Kalise Gran Canaria.
 Will play in the Liga LEB:
Grupo Capitol Valladolid and Grupo Begar León.
 Will play in the 2008–2009 ACB season:
CAI Zaragoza and Bruesa GBC.

Playoffs

Stats Leaders
Stats as of May 31, 2008

Points

Rebounds

Assists

MVP Week by Week

All-ACB Team

External links
 ACB.com 
 linguasport.com 

 
Liga ACB seasons
 
Spain